The Port of Motril–Granada or simply, the port of Motril, is a passenger and cargo port in Motril, Spain. It is one of the Puertos de Interés General del Estado ("ports of General Interest of the State").

History and description 

The foundation stone was laid on 21 October 1908. Building works ended in 1927. A bulk cargo dock was opened in 1994.

On 1 October 2005, the standalone Port Authority of Motril was created, upon a split from the Port Authority of Almería. Two years later, the expansion of the Azucenas dock was inaugurated, featuring ro-ro capabilities.

It is connected by ferry to Nador, Melilla, Al-Hoceima and Tanger-Med.

The port closed its 2019 year with a total cargo traffic of 2.8 million tonnes.

References 

Motril
Transport in Andalusia
Buildings and structures in the Province of Granada